Swell Court Farmhouse in Swell Lane, Fivehead, Somerset, England dates from the 15th century and has been designated as a Grade I listed building.

It is adjacent to Church of St Catherine, Fivehead which is also Grade I listed.

See also

 List of Grade I listed buildings in South Somerset
 List of towers in Somerset

References

Houses completed in the 15th century
Grade I listed buildings in South Somerset
Grade I listed houses in Somerset
Farmhouses in England